Ampersand Mountain is a  mountain in Franklin County in the High Peaks Wilderness Area of the northeastern Adirondacks, west of the High Peaks proper in New York State. The mountain takes its name from nearby Ampersand Creek, so named because it twists and turns like the ampersand symbol. The summit is bare rock, with extensive views of the High Peaks to the east and the Saranac Lakes to the west. Stony Creek Mountain is located west-southwest of Ampersand Mountain. The mountain is notable as the land surrounding its hiking trail's initial ascent is generally acknowledged as unlogged old growth forest.

History
W.W. Ely made the first recorded ascent of Ampersand Mountain in 1872.  Ely and Dr. William Reed and three others later cleared the summit of trees, and built a lean-to. The following year, Verplanck Colvin cleared the remaining trees while working on his survey of the Adirondacks, and subsequent fires and erosion left the summit bare. Colvin credits Ely for the mountain's name. New York State built a fire lookout station on the summit in 1911, although a fire tower was deemed unnecessary due to the open views available.  By 1920, tree growth was such that a  steel Aermotor LS40 fire tower was purchased and erected in 1921. The tower was used until 1970, when the New York State Department of Environmental Conservation closed it, as it had become more cost-effective to spot fires using aircraft. The tower was removed in July, 1977. There is a memorial near the summit to hermit Walter Channing Rice, who manned the fire tower from 1915 to 1923.

Ampersand was the first mountain that wilderness activist and explorer Bob Marshall climbed, in 1915, when he was 14.

See also 
 List of mountains in New York

References

External links

 
Adirondack Mountain Club - Ampersand Mountain
NYroute30.com - Ampersand Mountain Topographic Map
TupperLake.Net - Ampersand Mountain
Adirondack Sports and Fitness: "Water, Water Everywhere: The Views from Ampersand"
Ampersand Mt. Fire Tower - The Fire Towers of New York

Mountains of Franklin County, New York
Adirondacks
Mountains of New York (state)